Luiz Philipe Lima de Oliveira (born January 21, 1993 in Rio de Janeiro), known as Muralha or Luiz Philipe Muralha, is a Brazilian football who plays as a centre midfielder for Saudi Arabian club Al-Riyadh.
 
On 26 July 2021, Muralha joined Al-Qadsiah. On 7 August 2022, Muralha joined Al-Riyadh.

Career

Career statistics
(Correct )

according to combined sources on the Flamengo official website and Flaestatística.

Honours
Flamengo
Campeonato Carioca: 2011, 2014

Portuguesa
Campeonato Paulista Série A2: 2013

National Team
Copa Internacional do Mediterrâneo: 2011

References

External links

Player Profile @ Flapédia 

1993 births
Living people
Brazilian footballers
Brazilian expatriate footballers
Expatriate footballers in South Korea
Brazilian expatriate sportspeople in South Korea
Campeonato Brasileiro Série A players
Campeonato Brasileiro Série B players
CR Flamengo footballers
Associação Portuguesa de Desportos players
Clube Atlético Bragantino players
Luverdense Esporte Clube players
Pohang Steelers players
Al-Hazem F.C. players
Al-Qadsiah FC players
Al-Riyadh SC players
Saudi Professional League players
Saudi First Division League players
Expatriate footballers in Saudi Arabia
Brazilian expatriate sportspeople in Saudi Arabia
Association football midfielders
Footballers from Rio de Janeiro (city)